Mitchelton railway station is located on the Ferny Grove line in Queensland, Australia.  It is one of two railway stations serving the Brisbane suburb of Mitchelton, the other being Oxford Park railway station.

History
The station opened in March 1918 due to public demand. To the north of the station lies a turnback siding.

Services
Mitchelton station is served by all stops Ferny Grove line services from Ferny Grove to Roma Street, Park Road, Coopers Plains and Beenleigh.

Services by platform

Transport links
Brisbane Transport operate four routes from Mitchelton station:
369: to Toombul via Stafford
396: to Arana Hills
397: to Ferny Grove station via Everton Hills
398: to Ferny Grove station via Arana Hills

In addition the above, Brisbane Transport buses also call in by the nearby Brookside bus station.

References

External links

Mitchelton station Queensland Rail
Mitchelton station Queensland's Railways on the Internet
[ Mitchelton station] TransLink travel information

Mitchelton, Queensland
Railway stations in Brisbane
Railway stations in Australia opened in 1918